Toowong may refer to:

 Toowong, a suburb in Brisbane, Australia
 Toowong Cemetery
 Toowong FC, a football club
 Toowong Municipal Library Building, a heritage-listed former library
 Toowong railway station
 Toowong Reach, a reach of the Brisbane River
 Toowong Village, a shopping centre and office tower
 Town of Toowong, a former local government area
 Electoral district of Toowong, a former electoral district of the Queensland Legislative Assembly

See also
 Towong, Victoria